Robin Buffet (born 14 October 1991 in Annecy) is a French former alpine ski racer.

References

External links
 
 

1991 births
Living people
French male alpine skiers
Sportspeople from Annecy
Université Savoie-Mont Blanc alumni
Competitors at the 2015 Winter Universiade
21st-century French people